The CITRUS (Comprehensive I18N Framework Towards Respectable Unix Systems) project aims to implement a complete multilingual programming environment for BSD-based operating systems. The goals include the creation of the following things for FreeBSD, NetBSD, OpenBSD, BSD/OS and DragonFly BSD:

 An ISO C/SUS V2-compatible multilingual programming environment (locale/iconv support).
 Development of an implementation of gettext and POSIX NLS catalog under the BSD license.
 Multi-script framework, which decouples C API and actual external/internal encoding.
 To develop system standard multi-script encoding by internationalization of filename.

, the aim is to reach the same level of functionality as Solaris 7.

See also
 Internationalization and localization

External links 
 

Free software projects
Berkeley Software Distribution
Internationalization and localization
Unix programming tools
Programming tools